Franklin County was one of the counties of New Zealand in the North Island.

Franklin County took its name after the existing Parliamentary electorate of Franklin. This had evidently been named in
honour of Lady Jane Franklin, the wife of Sir John Franklin, the Arctic explorer. Lady Franklin had visited Robert Maunsell's mission station at the Waikato Heads in 1841.

Chairmen of Franklin County Council
Eight men served as chair of Franklin County Council during its 77-year existence:

See also 
 List of former territorial authorities in New Zealand § Counties

References

Counties of New Zealand
Politics of the Auckland Region
1912 establishments in New Zealand
1989 disestablishments in New Zealand
Former subdivisions of the Auckland Region